

suc-sug
succimer (INN)
succinobucol (USAN)
succinylsulfathiazole (INN)
succisulfone (INN)
suclofenide (INN)
Sucostrin
Sucraid
Sucralfate
sucralfate (INN)
sucralox (INN)
Sucrets
sucrosofate (INN)
Sudafed 12 Hour
Sudex
sudexanox (INN)
sudismase (INN)
sudoxicam (INN)
Sufenta
sufentanil (INN)
sufosfamide (INN)
sufotidine (INN)
sufugolix (INN)
sugammadex (INN)

sul

sula-sule
Sular
sulazepam (INN)
sulazuril (INN)
sulbactam (INN)
sulbenicillin (INN)
sulbenox (INN)
sulbentine (INN)
sulbutiamine (INN)
sulclamide (INN)
sulconazole (INN)
Sulcrate
suleparoid sodium (INN)
sulesomab (INN)

sulf
Sulf-10

sulfa
Sulfa-Gyn
Sulfa-Triple #2

sulfab-sulfac
sulfabenz (INN)
sulfabenzamide (INN)
Sulfabid
sulfacarbamide (INN)
sulfacecole (INN)
Sulfacel-15
Sulfacet-R
sulfacetamide (INN)
sulfachlorpyridazine (INN)
sulfachrysoidine (INN)
sulfacitine (INN)
sulfaclomide (INN)
sulfaclorazole (INN)
sulfaclozine (INN)

sulfad-sulfal
sulfadiasulfone sodium (INN)
sulfadiazine sodium (INN)
sulfadiazine (INN)
sulfadicramide (INN)
sulfadimethoxine (INN)
sulfadimidine (INN)
sulfadoxine (INN)
sulfaethidole (INN)
sulfafurazole (INN)
sulfaguanidine (INN)
sulfaguanole (INN)
Sulfair
Sulfalar
sulfalene (INN)
Sulfaloid
sulfaloxic acid (INN)

sulfam-sulfar
sulfamazone (INN)
sulfamerazine sodium (INN)
sulfamerazine (INN)
sulfamethizole (INN)
Sulfamethoprim
sulfamethoxazole (INN)
sulfamethoxypyridazine (INN)
sulfametomidine (INN)
sulfametoxydiazine (INN)
sulfametrole (INN)
sulfamonomethoxine (INN)
sulfamoxole (INN)
Sulfamylon
sulfanilamide (INN)
sulfanitran (INN)
sulfaperin (INN)
sulfaphenazole (INN)
sulfaproxyline (INN)
sulfapyrazole (INN)
sulfapyridine (INN)
sulfaquinoxaline (INN)
sulfarsphenamine (INN)

sulfas-sulfat
sulfasalazine (INN)
sulfasomizole (INN)
sulfasuccinamide (INN)
sulfasymazine (INN)
sulfathiazole (INN)
sulfathiourea (INN)
sulfatolamide (INN)
Sulfatrim
sulfatroxazole (INN)
sulfatrozole (INN)

sulfi-sulfo
sulfinalol (INN)
sulfinpyrazone (INN)
sulfiram (INN)
sulfisomidine (INN)
sulfocon B (USAN)
sulfogaiacol (INN)
sulfomyxin (INN)
Sulfonamides Duplex
sulfonterol (INN)
sulfonylurea, known also as Diabeta (Sanofi-Aventis) and glyburide
sulforidazine (INN)
Sulfose

sulg-sulo
sulglicotide (INN)
sulicrinat (INN)
sulindac (INN)
sulisatin (INN)
sulisobenzone (INN)
sulla
sulmarin (INN)
sulmazole (INN)
sulmepride (INN)
Sulmeprim
sulnidazole (INN)
sulocarbilate (INN)
suloctidil (INN)
sulodexide (INN)
sulofenur (INN)
sulopenem etzadroxil (USAN)
sulopenem (INN)
sulosemide (INN)
sulotroban (INN)
suloxifen (INN)

sulp-sulv
sulparoid (INN)
Sulphrin
sulpiride (INN)
sulprosal (INN)
sulprostone (INN)
Sulsoxin
Sulster
sultamicillin (INN)
Sulten-10
sultiame (INN)
sultopride (INN)
sultosilic acid (INN)
Sultrin
sultroponium (INN)
sulukast (INN)
sulverapride (INN)